Anput is a goddess in ancient Egyptian religion. Her name is written in hieroglyphs as jnpwt (reconstructed in Middle Egyptian as /ʔan.ˈpa.wat/ or /jan.ˈpa.wat/). In English, her name also is rendered as Anupet, Input, Inpewt, and Yineput. As the female counterpart of her husband, Anubis, who was known as jnpw to the Egyptians, Anput's name ends in a feminine "t" suffix when seen as jnpwt.

She was often depicted as a pregnant or nursing jackal, or as a jackal wielding knives. She also is depicted as a woman, with a headdress showing a jackal recumbent upon a feather, as seen in the statue of the divine triad of Hathor, Menkaure, and Anput. She occasionally is depicted as a woman with the head of a jackal, but this is very rare.

Mythology 
Anput is the female counterpart of the god Anubis. She is also a goddess of the seventeenth nome of Upper Egypt. She is also considered the protector of the body of Osiris.

References

External links

Egyptian death goddesses
Mythological canines
Anubis